Shivalinga is a 2017 Indian Tamil-language horror comedy mystery film directed by P. Vasu, starring Raghava Lawrence, Ritika Singh, Shakthi Vasudevan, Vadivelu and Urvashi in the leading roles. 

A remake of Vasu's earlier 2016 Kannada film of the same name which starring Shivaraj Kumar, the project began production in July 2016.

Plot
Raheem and his well-trained pigeon Saara are alone in a coach aboard a train when a blind man enters and reaches an open door. Raheem saves the man, but the man turns out to be an assassin and throws Raheem off the moving train to his death. Raheem's death is ruled a suicide, but Raheem's fiancée Sangeetha knows that Raheem had no reason to kill himself. The same night, Raheem appears in Sangeetha's dream and says that he was murdered. The following day, Raheem's case is forwarded to the CBCID at Sangeetha's request.

Shivalingeshwaran aka Shiva is a strict CID officer who is married to a thrill-seeker named Sathya. The two live in a house that is near a cemetery. Shiva is assigned to Raheem's case and begins the investigation. The same night, Sathya sees a ghost of a child and is frightened by this. However, Shiva cannot see the ghost and thinks that Sathya is imagining it. Then he appoints Pattukunjam, a thief who comes to that house as a servant and night watchman. The following day, Shiva visits Raheem's home to investigate Raheem's relationship with his father and with Sangeetha. Shiva suspects Sangeetha's father Krishnamoorthy is responsible for Raheem's death as he disapproved Raheem & Sangeetha's love, only to find out that he has nothing to do with Raheem's death.

Sathya's behaviour becomes erratic. She travels around the city in search of someone and she's redecorated the house with green curtains and lights, and she has cooked Biriyani, even though she has no experience in cooking. Pattukunjam and a few other maids inform Shiva about Sathya's strange behaviour. Shiva meets his friend and psychiatrist, Ashok who advises Shiva to observe her behaviour secretly. That night, Shiva returns home early. He hears a man's voice and smells a cigar burning. He heads to Sathya's room and is shocked to discover that Raheem's soul has possessed Sathya's body. Raheem warns Shiva, that he must solve Raheem's murder.

Shiva accesses the security footage at the railway station and discovers that a person, who was acting as a blind man is the killer. Shiva tracks down the killer and chases him, finally cornering him on a train coach with no passengers. Sathya, who is still possessed by Raheem, enters and demands to know why the man killed him. The man tries to escape by jumping out of the moving train but falls to his death. Shiva takes Sathya to a Darga, informing only Sathya's mother Sarala about what has been happening. Baba  helps them to exorcise Raheem's soul out, but only temporarily. He tells Shiva that solving Raheem's case is the only solution for saving Sathya.

Shiva starts the investigation piece by piece, and Raheem's pigeon Saara helps Shiva by giving clues. Shiva interrogates Sathya at the CID Conference Hall about Raheem. It is then revealed that Raheem recovered Sathya's stolen iPad and returned it to her. Raheem refuses to even tell his name, so Sathya clicks a picture of him for the sake of his noble gesture. Sathya's stalker college mate sees this and feels jealous. So he makes a call to Sathya's residential landline and when her father Viswanathan answers, he purposefully plants wrong information that Sathya and Raheem are planning to elope and marry. Hearing this, Viswanathan hires David, an assassin to injure and cripple Raheem.

After unveiling the truth about the mistaken identity, the ghost of Raheem possesses Sathya and threatens everyone present in the hall. Sathya's father begs for his forgiveness and tells that he intended to only harm Raheem, not to kill him. Shiva also begs Raheem to leave Sathya's body and asks Raheem to possess him instead, promising to show the killer. Then, it is revealed that a pigeon race organizer, discovered David's assignment to injure Raheem and paid David more money to kill him since Raheem and Saara are his nemeses in the pigeon race and the duo always wins. The organizer is insulted by his friends for his incapability. The possessed Shiva kills all the henchmen while allowing Raheem to exit his body and possess and kills the pigeon race organiser. In the end credits, Shiva and a pregnant Sathya reunite.

Cast

Raghava Lawrence as Shivalingeswaran, a CBI officer 
Ritika Singh as Sathyabama
Shakthi Vasudevan as Raheem 
Vadivelu as Pattukunjam (Tamil)
Brahmanandam as Brahmi (Telugu)
Urvashi as Arusuvai Annalakshmi
Radharavi as Krishnamurthy
Santhana Bharathi as Abdullah
Jayaprakash as Viswanathan
VTV Ganesh as N. Murali (Tamil)
Raghu Babu as R. Babu (Telugu)
Bhanupriya as Sarala
Saipriya Deva as Sangeetha
Pradeep Rawat as Baba 
Zakir Hussain as Pigeon Race Organizer & Main culprit in Raheem's Murder 
Madhuvanti Arun as CID Chief 
Sivashankar as Arusuvai Annalakshmi's assistant 
Bharathi
Danny Kuttappa as David
Shyam Prasad 
P. Vasu in a cameo appearance in song Saarah Saarah

Production
Following the success of P. Vasu's Kannada horror film, Shivalinga (2016), the filmmaker chose to remake the project in Tamil. Vasu initially tried to market the project as Chandramukhi 2, as a spiritual sequel to Chandramukhi (2005), and approached Rajinikanth to portray the lead role. However, the actor did not accept to work on the project, while reports suggested that Vasu may approach Ajith Kumar for the film. In March 2016, Raghava Lawrence accepted to work on the film, while Vadivelu was also signed on to appear in a role thereafter. After negotiations with Anushka Shetty and Hansika Motwani, Vasu chose to sign on Ritika Singh for the female lead role. Vasu's son, Shakthi was also added to the cast to reprise the role he had portrayed in the original version. Shakthi revealed that his character would have more prominence in the Tamil version, in comparison with the Kannada version.

The film was launched in a ceremony during mid July 2016, with Radharavi, Bhanupriya and Urvashi revealed to be a part of the cast. The film's first schedule was completed in Chennai during August 2016. The film ended up being a commercial success, a huge comeback for Lawrence and director P. Vasu.

Reception
The Hindustan Times gave the film a 2 out of 5 star review.

Soundtrack
The soundtrack was composed by S. Thaman.

References

External links
 

2017 films
2017 comedy horror films
2017 horror thriller films
2010s Tamil-language films
Tamil remakes of Kannada films
Indian comedy horror films
Films scored by Thaman S
Films directed by P. Vasu
Films shot in Karnataka
Films shot in Bangalore
Indian horror thriller films
Indian horror film remakes